You Are My Destiny is a 2014 South Korean television series starring Jang Hyuk, Jang Na-ra, Choi Jin-hyuk and Wang Ji-won. It aired on MBC from July 2 to September 4, 2014, on Wednesdays and Thursdays at 21:55 for 20 episodes.

It is a remake of the Taiwanese drama Fated to Love You starring Joe Chen and Ethan Ruan, which received high ratings during its run in 2008. The series also reunited Jang Hyuk and Jang Na-ra, who previously starred together twelve years before on Successful Story of a Bright Girl (2002).

Synopsis
Lee Gun (Jang Hyuk) is the successor to a large company run by his family. Kim Mi Young (Jang Nara) is an average-looking secretary in a law firm who earned the nickname “Post-It” for her inability to say no to her colleagues who dump work on her. When the two cross paths one night after separately having drunk a drugged liquid, a comedy of errors occurs. Kim Mi Young goes into the wrong hotel room because the hotel door number accidentally changes, and the door is propped open by the mischief-making drugged liquid makers. The two end up sleeping together and Kim Mi Young becoming pregnant.  Lee Gun and his mother are about to lose power in the company due to his failure to marry his love (a ballerina, Kang Se Ra) and produce a male heir.  Lee Gun and Mi-Young  marry after knowing each other for "four days and two nights" and the story is that of an unwilling couple learning to love each other. Se Ra (Wang Ji-won) and Daniel (Choi Jin Hyuk) are alternative love interests.

Other important themes which drive the storyline are: responsibility and hereditory disease, and dealing with the grief at the loss of an (unborn) child.

Cast

Main
Jang Hyuk as Lee Gun
The wealthy heir to a large hair product company with a trademark maniacal laugh. He is a descendant, the only one of his generation, of the distinguished Jeonju Lee clan, a lineage that has all the males dying in their thirties due to Huntington's disease. Though utterly devoted and affectionate towards the people he cares about, Lee Gun can be cold, selfish, and prickly to everyone else. However, he is genuinely warm-hearted and responsible, wanting to do his best for Mi-young and their baby. Although he was shocked and reluctant at the news of a shotgun wedding, Gun starts warming up to Mi-young's sweet nature and pure heart.

Jang Na-ra as Kim Mi-young/Ellie Kim
A naïve office worker at a law firm. She has no wealthy family, prestigious education, or much beauty, but rather comes from a small island where her mom owns a small restaurant. Because of her timid and kind-to-a-fault nature, she cannot bear to turn down a request from anyone and is nicknamed the "post-it girl," someone who is necessary but unimportant. While she lacks self-confidence, Mi-young always sees the best in people and upholds a quiet strength. When an accidental one-night stand gets her pregnant, her plain and insignificant existence changes as Lee Gun enters her life.

Choi Jin-hyuk as Daniel Pitt/Kim Tae-ho
An internationally famous Korean-American designer whose single goal is finding his long-lost biological sister. He meets Mi-young by accident, and is intrigued by her kindness. From then on, he becomes her Daddy-Long-Legs, encouraging her when she is down and coming to her rescue when she needs help. Constantly worrying about her, Daniel begins to realize that what he feels towards Mi-young is something more than protectiveness. He is the biological brother of Kang Se-ra.

Wang Ji-won as Kang Se-ra/Kim Mi-young
The love of Lee Gun's life. She is a ballerina in New York City with a surprisingly no-nonsense attitude. She has been with Gun for 6 years, delaying any plans of marriage for her career. But when she fails to get a lead part, Se-ra comes back to Korea to stay with Gun. A sudden callback has her choosing ballet over Gun one more time, but when she comes back for good, she finds drastic changes in Gun's life. She is the long-lost biological sister of Daniel Pitt.

Supporting

Park Won-sook as Chairwoman Wang, Lee Gun's grandmother
Choi Dae-chul as Manager Tak
Choi Woo-shik as Lee Yong, Lee Gun's half-brother
Na Young-hee as Lee Gun's stepmother and Lee Yong's mother
Song Ok-sook as Mi-young's mother
Park Hee-von as Jeon Ji-yeon, Mi-young's co-worker and roommate who later becomes Yong's girlfriend
Oh Sol Mi as Kim Mi-sook, Mi-young's oldest sister
Lee Mi-do as Kim Mi-ja, Mi-young's second oldest sister
Jung Eun-pyo as Company president Park, owner of soap factory
Im Hyung-joon as Mr. Choi, Mi-ja's husband
Jang Gwang as Doctor Moon
Park Jin-woo  as Lawyer Hong
Kim Young-hoon as Lawyer Min Byung-chul
Yang Geum-seok as Se-ra's mother
Park Sun-hee as Eun-jung
Jung Han-hyun as Lee Sung-mok
Im Ji-hyun as Soo-hyun
Yeon Mi-joo as Miss Kim
Park Hee-jin as Prenatal class instructor/Baby store employee/Dance instructor
Kim Sung-il as Stylist 
Park Tae-yoon as Makeup artist 
Jung Gyu-soo as Psychiatrist 
Ki Se-hyung as Security guard
Shin Young-il as Moderator at auction event 
Kim Sun-woong as Moon Woo Bin	
Clara as Hye-jin, shampoo commercial model (cameo, ep 1)
Jung Joon-young as Radio DJ (cameo, ep 8)
Joon Park as Himself, body wash commercial model (cameo, ep 13)
Kim Yong-gun as Ji-yeon's chaebol father (cameo, ep 20)

Original soundtrack

Reception

Due to its popularity, the program was also broadcast in selected countries worldwide.

Awards and nominations

Viewership

References

External links
 
You Are My Destiny at MBC Global Media

2014 South Korean television series debuts
2014 South Korean television series endings
MBC TV television dramas
Korean-language television shows
South Korean television series based on non-South Korean television series
South Korean romantic comedy television series
Fated to Love You